Leap was established in 2007 by University of Suffolk, Suffolk Learning and Skills Council and Suffolk County Council with funding from East of England Development Agency.

Leap is unique to Suffolk and delivers free and impartial, high quality information and signposting to everyone seeking education or training opportunities through a website. Leap also works with the Suffolk Chamber of Commerce to assist businesses hoping to improve the skills of their workforce.

Overview
Leap is partnership between the University of Suffolk and Suffolk Chamber of Commerce  to provide web based information on learning, training and skills provision in Suffolk.  In April 2009, University of Suffolk took over as the lead partner for the project.

The Leap Website is the central portal for information about adult learning and skills courses in Suffolk and enables individuals to browse the course database and choose from approximately 6,000 local courses including, Further and Higher Education, Leisure and Community Learning Courses as well as business to business training.

Aims
The aim of Leap is to  provide free and impartial, high quality information to everyone seeking education or training opportunities in Suffolk through a single web portal.

Students
Individuals aged 18+ from all backgrounds take advantage of Leap for information and resources to education and training.

References

External links
Official Website
University of Suffolk
Suffolk Chamber of Commerce

Education in Suffolk